Van Zant was an American musical duo composed of brothers Donnie Van Zant and Johnny Van Zant. Both are brothers of Ronnie Van Zant, the original lead singer for the Southern rock band Lynyrd Skynyrd. Johnny became the lead vocalist for the reunited Lynyrd Skynyrd in 1987. Donnie was the leader and vocalist of .38 Special.

Initially a Southern rock band, Van Zant first recorded in the 1980s on Network /Geffen Records before disbanding. Johnny and Donnie re-established Van Zant in 1998 to record two albums for CMC International, switching their focus to country music in 2005, with two more albums on Columbia Records as a duo. The duo's first Columbia album, Get Right with the Man, produced a top ten country hit in "Help Somebody".

History 
Johnny recorded as a member of the 1980s southern rock band The Johnny Van Zant Band which released albums in 1980, 1981 and 1982. The band shortened its name to Van Zant for the release of its fourth album in 1985, the eponymous Van Zant on Network /Geffen Records. This album saw chart success with "You've Got to Believe in Love" and "I'm a Fighter" (written by Jimi Jamison and Mandy Meyer from Cobra), both of which peaked on the Mainstream Rock Tracks chart. However, this band did not include Donnie and was soon disbanded.

Johnny released another album under his full name in 1990, but spent most of his time in that period singing for the Lynyrd Skynyrd reunion group. He joined up with Donnie, and they revived the Van Zant name to release an album in 1998, Brother to Brother Initially intended as a one-off project, Brother to Brother saw chart success in the single "Rage", so the duo followed it up in 2001 with Van Zant II for the label. This album included their fourth charting rock single in "Get What You Got Comin.

Country music career 
In 2005, the duo crossed over into country music, releasing Get Right with the Man on Columbia Records. The album produced a Top 10 country single in "Help Somebody", followed by the No. 16 "Nobody Gonna Tell Me What to Do" and No. 59 "Things I Miss the Most". The album also earned RIAA gold certification. The Sony BMG copy protection rootkit scandal in 2005 began with an investigation of an installation of the CD Get Right with the Man.

It was not possible to import the CD into iTunes because of a glitch created by Sony's digital rights management software. The glitch was eventually fixed when the second Sony uninstaller offered allowed for the software to be removed. iTunes can import the CD now, even from the original copy-protected version of the disc.

Van Zant released a second album for Columbia, My Kind of Country, in 2007. This album included the singles "That Scares Me" and "Goes Down Easy", both of which failed to reach Top 40 on the country charts. After the release of the latter, the duo exited Columbia.

Donnie had been forced to retire from his work with 38 Special due to health problems in 2013. In 2019, Johnny stated in an interview that he and Donnie had continued to work on new music and were planning on releasing some of the work after Lynyrd Skynyrd disbanded.

Discography

Studio albums

Live albums

Singles

Guest singles

Music videos

References

External links 
 Official Van Zant site

Country music duos
Rock music duos
Southern rock musical groups from Jacksonville
Country music groups from Florida
Columbia Records artists
Sibling musical duos
Musical groups established in 1985
Musical groups disestablished in 1985
Musical groups reestablished in 1998
Musical groups disestablished in 2001
Musical groups reestablished in 2005
Musical groups disestablished in 2007
1985 establishments in Florida